Chintamoni Kar Bird Sanctuary (CKBS), also known as Kayal-r Bagan, is a bird sanctuary located in West Bengal, India, south of Kolkata. This garden is famous for its wide variety of birds, butterflies, ferns and orchids.

History
 
It was given sanctuary status in 1982. Before then, it was originally a large mango garden with huge mango trees. The government of West Bengal took the initiative to make it open to the public and acquired it from private owners in October 2005. On 8 September 2004 it was named Narendrapur Wildlife Sanctuary, and on 21 October 2005 it was renamed Chintamoni Kar Bird Sanctuary, in honour of celebrated sculptor Chintamoni Kar, who had for many years fought relentlessly to give the "kayaler bagan" status for the sanctuary.

Transport
The nearest populated place, Narendrapur, is 15 km from Sealdah on the SealdahSonarpur line and is part of the Kolkata Suburban Railway system. It is connected by road to Garia and the EM Bypass. It is 20 km from Howrah railway station.

List of common birds
All name in the brackets "()" are the scientific names.
Ashy drongo(Dicrurus leucophaeus)
Asian koel (Eudynamys scolopaceo)
Brown fish owl (Ketupa zeylonensis)
Black Drongo(Dicrurus macrocercus)
Shikra (Accipiter badius)
Indian pond heron (Ardeola grayii)
Bronzed drongo(Dicruridae)
Cattle egret (Bubulcus ibis)
Scaly-breasted munia (Lonchura punchtulata)
Little egret (Egretta garzetta)
Little cormorant (Phalacocorax niger)
White wagtail (Motacilla alba personanta)
Asian green bee-eater (Merops orientalis)
House crow (Corvus splendens)
Large-billed crow (Corvus macrorhynchos)
Rufous treepie (Dendrocitta vagabunda)
White-throated kingfisher (Halcyon smyrnensis)
Stork-billed kingfisher (Halcyon capensis)
Fulvous-breasted woodpecker (Dendrocopos macei)
Rufous woodpecker (Celeus brachyurus)
Streak-throated woodpecker (Picus xanthopygaeus)
Common emerald dove (Chalcophaps indica)
Spotted dove (Spilopelia chinensis)
Indian paradise flycatcher (terpsiphone paradisi)
Oriental magpie-robin (Copsychus saularis)
Olive-backed Sunbird(Cinnyris jugularis)
Black-hooded oriole (Oriolus xanthornus)
Cinereous tit (Parus cinereus)
Chestnut-tailed starling (Sturnia malabarica)
Red-vented bulbul (Pycnonotus cafer)
Oriental White Eye (Zosterops palpebrosus)
White-throated Fantail (Rhipidura albicollis)

List of common spiders
All name in the brackets "()" are the scientific names.

Garden spider or signature spider (Argiope pulchella)
Imitation spider (Cyclosa sp.)
Grass jewel spider (Cyrtarachne keralayensis)
Lagalaisei's garden spider (Eriovixia sp.)
Kidney garden spider (Araneus mitificus)
Tent web spider or dome weavers (Cyrtophora sp.)
Dark wolf spider (Pardosa sp.)
Wolf spider (Lycosa sp.)
Yellow sac spider (Cheiracanthium sp.)
Banded phintella jumping spider (Phintella vittata)
Joly spider (Epocilla aurantiaca)
Heavy bodied jumper (Hyllus semicupreus)
Ant mimic spider (Myrmarachne sp.)
Fighting spider (Thiania sp.)
Pantropical jumping spider (Plexippus paykulli)
Green crab spider (Olios milleti)
Silver orb spider (Leucauge granulata)
Orchard spider or decorative silver orb spider (Leucauge decorate)
Common house spider (Achaearanea sp.)
Crab spider or brown flower spider (Camaricus sp.)

List of common butterflies
All name in the brackets "()" are the scientific names.
Common Jezebel হরতনি (Delias eucharis)
Redbase Jezebel লোপামুদ্রা (Delias pasithoe)
Tawny coster হরিনছড়া (Acraea terpsicore)
Common leopard চিতা (Phalanta phalantha)
Grey pansy চাঁদনরি (Junonia atlites)
Common jester পিপুল্কাটি (Symbrenthia lilaea)
Peacock pansy নয়ান (Junonia almana)
Striped tiger বাঘবল্লা (Danaus genutia)
Blue tiger (Tirumala limniace)
Chestnut tiger ছিট্মউল (Parantica sita)
Common emigrant পায়রাচালি (Catopsilia pomona)
Common pierrot তিলাইয়া (Castalius rosimon)
Red pierrot সাজুন্তি (Talicada nyseus)

See also
 Kanwar Taal Bird Sanctuary
 Sultanpur Bird Sanctuary
 Bharatpur Bird Sanctuary

References

Bird sanctuaries of West Bengal
Protected areas established in 1982
Tourist attractions in South 24 Parganas district
1982 establishments in West Bengal